Nicolás Hernán Siri Cagno (born 17 April 2004) is a Uruguayan professional footballer who plays as a forward for Montevideo City Torque.

Club career

Danubio
Siri is a youth academy graduate of Danubio. He made his professional debut for the club on 20 September 2020 in a 2–2 draw against Boston River. On 19 March 2021, he scored a hat-trick in a 5–1 league win against the same opponent. This made him the second youngest player in history to score a hat-trick in professional football, only behind Trevor Francis.  He also became the youngest South American to score a hat-trick in professional football, a record which was held by Diego Maradona since 1977 and Pelé prior to that.

Montevideo City Torque
On 27 August 2021, Siri joined Montevideo City Torque. He signed a six-year deal until June 2027.

International career
Siri is a current Uruguay youth international. He was part of Uruguay squad at 2019 South American U-15 Championship.

Personal life
Siri is younger brother of former Danubio teammate Enzo Siri.

Career statistics

References

External links
 

2004 births
Living people
Uruguayan people of Italian descent
Footballers from Montevideo
Association football forwards
Uruguayan footballers
Uruguay youth international footballers
Uruguayan Primera División players
Uruguayan Segunda División players
Danubio F.C. players
Montevideo City Torque players